Víctor Ciriaco Junco Tassinari (18 June 1917 – 6 July 1988), known professionally as Víctor Junco, was a Mexican actor. He was considered a star of the Golden Age of Mexican cinema. During his career, Junco received two Ariel Award nominations for his supporting performances in La Otra (1946) and Misterio (1980), he won for the latter.

Selected filmography
 The Two Orphans (1944)
 The Private Life of Mark Antony and Cleopatra (1947)
 Nocturne of Love (1948)
 The Well-paid (1948)
 Coquette (1949)
 The Woman of the Port (1949)
 Love for Love (1950)
 The Devil Is a Woman (1950)
 Wild Love (1950)
 Lost Love (1951)
 Adventure in Rio (1953)
 The Loving Women (1953)
 Bandido (1956)
 Ash Wednesday (1958)
 La señora Muerte (1969)

References

External links

1917 births
1988 deaths
Mexican male film actors
20th-century Mexican male actors
Male actors from Veracruz